This is a list of programs by WildBrain and its predecessors Decode Entertainment, Halifax Film Company, Studio B Productions, the original incarnation of WildBrain, Cookie Jar Group/CINAR, DIC Entertainment, FilmFair, Ragdoll Productions, Epitome Pictures, Nerd Corps Entertainment, Iconix Brand Group, Echo Bridge Home Entertainment, Leucadia Films, and imX Communications.

Note that some shows were co-productions with other companies, and may or may not necessarily be owned by WildBrain.

Animated series

WildBrain 
 Rastamouse (2011–2015) (co-production with Sony Pictures Television International)
 SheZow (2012–2013) (co-production with Kickstart Productions and Moody Street Kids)
 Ella the Elephant (2013–2014) (co-production with TVOKids and FremantleMedia Kids & Family Entertainment)
 The Doozers (2013–2018) (co-production with The Jim Henson Company)
 Transformers: Rescue Bots (2014–2016) (Seasons 3-4 for Hasbro Studios) (Season 1 was produced by Atomic Cartoons and Darby Pop Productions and Season 2 was produced by Vision Animation and Moody Street Kids)
 Messy Goes to Okido (2015) (co-production with Doodle Productions)
 Kuu Kuu Harajuku (2015–2019) (co-production with Vision Animation and Moody Street Kids)
 Fangbone! (2016–2017) (co-production with Radical Sheep Productions)
 Little People (2016–2018) (co-production with HIT Entertainment and Fisher-Price)
 Rainbow Ruby (2016–2020) (co-production with CJ E&M)
 Spongo, Fuzz & Jalapeña (2019–present) (co-production with Cheeky Little Productions)
 Denis and Me (2020–present) (short series distributor; produced by Headspinner Productions)
 The Brilliant World of Tom Gates (2021–present) (distributor; produced by TG Entertainment Ltd, Black Camel Pictures and Wild Child Animation)
 Alva's World (2021–present) (distributor; produced by Kavaleer Productions)
 Summer Memories (2022) (co-production with Aircraft Pictures and Yeti Farm)

Decode Entertainment 
 Freaky Stories (1997–2000) (co-production with Sound Venture Productions, Funbag Animation Studios, and Vujade Entertainment)
 Angela Anaconda (1999–2001) (co-production with C.O.R.E.)
 Watership Down (1999–2001) (co-production with Alltime Entertainment)
 Weird-Oh's (1999–2001) (co-production with Mainframe Entertainment and EM.TV)
 Rainbow Fish (2000) (co-production with EM.TV for Sony Wonder)
 What About Mimi? (2000-2002) (co-production with Studio B Productions)
 Undergrads (2001) (co-production with MTV Animation)
 Girlstuff/Boystuff (2002–2005) (co-production with Agogo Media and AE, Ltd)
 Olliver's Adventures (2002–2005) (co-production with Collideascope Digital Productions)
 The Save-Ums! (2003–2006) (co-production with Discovery Kids, The Dan Clark Company, and C.O.R.E.)
 Franny's Feet (2003–2010) (co-production with C.O.R.E. Toons (season 3 only))
 King (2003–2005) (co-production with Funbag Animation Studios)
 The Blobheads (2003)
 Bromwell High (2005) (co-production with Hat Trick Productions)
 Delilah & Julius (2005–2008) (co-production with Collideascope Digital Productions)
 Planet Sketch (2005) (co-production with Aardman Animations)
 Dudson's Modern Tales (2006)
 The Naughty Naughty Pets (2006)
 Super Why! (2007–2016) (co-production with Out of the Blue Enterprises) (Seasons 1–2)
 Clang Invasion (2007) (co-production Scrawl Studios and AGOGO Entertainment Ltd.)
 Urban Vermin (2007–2008) (co-production with YTV)
 The Mighty Jungle (2007–2008) (co-production with Halifax Film)
 Chop Socky Chooks (2008–2009) (co-production with Aardman Animations)
 Dirtgirlworld (2010–2012) (co-production with Mememe Productions)
 Poppets Town (2011–2015) (co-production with Neptuno Films)
 Waybuloo (2011–2014, Animation/Live Action)

Halifax Film/DHX Studios Halifax 
 Poko (2003–2008)
 Lunar Jim (2006)
 Bo on the Go! (2007–2011)
 Animal Mechanicals (2007–2011)
 The Mighty Jungle (2008) (co-production with Decode Entertainment)
 Pirates: Adventures in Art (2010)
 Doozers (2013–2014) (co-production with The Jim Henson Company)
 Inspector Gadget (2015–2018)
 Wishenpoof! (2015)
 Super Why! (2015–2016) (co-production with 9 Story USA)  (Season 3)
 Space Ranger Roger (2017)

WildBrain Studios 
 Kate & Mim-Mim (2014–2018) (co-produced with FremantleMedia Kids and Family)
 Blaze and the Monster Machines (2014–present) (co-produced with WildBrain for Nickelodeon)
 The Mr. Peabody & Sherman Show (2015–2017) (co-production for DreamWorks Animation Television)
 Supernoobs (2015–2019)
 The Deep (2015–present) (co-produced with WildBrain and Technicolor SA)
 Looped (2016) (co-production with Neptoon Studios)
 Chuck's Choice (2017)
 Massive Monster Mayhem (2017)
 Polly Pocket (2018–2020) (co-production with Mattel)
 The Adventures of Rocky and Bullwinkle (2018–2019) (co-production with Jay Ward Productions for DreamWorks Animation Television)
 Mega Man: Fully Charged (2018–2019) (co-production with Capcom, Man of Action, Dentsu Entertainment USA and WildBrain)
 Chip and Potato (2018–present) (co-production with Darrall Macqueen)
 Carmen Sandiego (2019–2021) (co-production with Houghton Mifflin Harcourt)
 Ninjago (2019–2022) (Seasons 11–15) (co-production with The Lego Group)
 Peanuts in Space: Secrets of Apollo 10 (2019) (co-production with Schulz Studio, Imagine Documentaries and Tremolo Productions)
 Rev & Roll (2019) (co-production with Alpha Group Co., Ltd.)
 Snoopy in Space (2019–present) (co-production with Schulz Studio, Imagine Documentaries and Tremolo Productions)
 Dorg Van Dango (2020–present) (co-production with Cartoon Saloon)
 Go, Dog. Go! (2021–present) (co-production with DreamWorks Animation Television)
 The Snoopy Show (2021–present) (co-production with Schulz Studio)
 Johnny Test (2021–2022)
 The Proud Family: Louder and Prouder (2022) (co-production for Disney Television Animation and BAR Productions)
 Sonic Prime (2022) (co-production with Man of Action Entertainment and Sega)

Studio B Productions/DHX Studios Vancouver 
 Yvon of the Yukon (1999–2005) (co-production with Corus Entertainment)
 What About Mimi? (2000-2003) (co-production with Decode Entertainment)
 D'Myna Leagues (2000–2002) (co-production with CTV)
 Yakkity Yak (2002–2003) (co-production with Kapow Pictures and Nickelodeon Productions)
 Something Else (2003) (co-production with TV-Loonland AG and Family Channel Canada)
 Being Ian (2005–2008) (co-production with Nelvana)
 Class of the Titans (2005–2008) (co-production with Nelvana)
 The Amazing Adrenalini Brothers (2006–2007) (co-production with Bejuba Entertainment and Pesky)
 Pucca (2006–2008)
 George of the Jungle (2007–2008) (co-production with DreamWorks Classics)
 Ricky Sprocket: Showbiz Boy (2007–2009) (co-production with Bejuba Entertainment and SnowdenFine Animation)
 Edgar & Ellen (2007-2008) (co-production with Bardel Entertainment)
 Martha Speaks (2008–2014) (co-production with WGBH)
 Kid vs. Kat (2008–2011)
 Super Supremes Non-Stop Nursery Rhymes (2010-2013) (co-production with Hasbro Studios and USP Studios and Top Draw Animation)
 My Little Pony: Friendship Is Magic (2010–2019) (co-production with Hasbro Studios and Top Draw Animation)
 Pound Puppies (2010–2013) (co-production with Hasbro Studios)
 Littlest Pet Shop (2012–2016) (co-production with Hasbro Studios)
 Packages from Planet X (2013–2014) (co-production with American Greetings)
 Dr. Dimensionpants (2014–2015) (co-production with The Factory Backwards Entertainment)

Nerd Corps Entertainment 
 Dragon Booster (2004–2006)
 Storm Hawks (2007–2009)
 League of Super Evil (2009–2012)
 Hot Wheels Battle Force 5 (2009–2011)
 Rated A for Awesome (2011–2012)
 Slugterra (2012–present) (co-produced with Disney XD Canada (now Family Chrgd))
 Monster High (2012–2016) (co-produced with Mattel)
 Max Steel (2013–2016)
 Endangered Species (2015)

WildBrain (original)/DHX Los Angeles 
 Space is Dum (1999–2001)
 Poochini (2000–2002) (distributed by Studio 100)
 Higglytown Heroes (2004–2008) (co-production with Happy Nest for Playhouse Disney)
 Yo Gabba Gabba! (2007–2015)
 Team Smithereen (2009–2011)
 The Ricky Gervais Show (2010–2012)
 Monster High (2010) (co-produced with Mattel)
 Bubble Guppies (2011-present) (co-production with Nickelodeon Productions) (Season 1 only)
 SheZow (2012–2013) (co-production with Kickstart Productions and Moody Street Kids)
 UMIGO (2012–2014)
 Sheriff Callie's Wild West (2014–2017) (co-production with Wild Canary Animation for Disney Junior)

CINAR/Cookie Jar Entertainment 
 The World of David the Gnome (1985–86) (co-produced by BRB Internacional, and Miramax Films, United States & Canada distribution only)
 The Wonderful Wizard of Oz (1986–1987)
 The Adventures of Albert and Sidney (1986–1996)
 Adventures of the Little Koala (1987–1993) (co-produced by Viacom)
 The Smoggies (1988)
 C.L.Y.D.E. (1990–1991) (co-produced by France Animation)
 Maya the Honey Bee (1990) (Saban dub, YTV airing only)
 Dr. Xargle (1991) (co-produced by King Rollo Films)
 Young Robin Hood (1991–1992) (co-produced by Hanna-Barbera)
 A Bunch of Munsch (1991–1992)
 Chip and Charlie (1992)
 The Legend of White Fang (1992–1994) (co-produced by France Animation)
 Papa Beaver's Storytime (1993–1994)
 The Busy World of Richard Scarry (1993–1997) (co-produced by France Animation, BBC, and Paramount Television)
 Albert the Fifth Musketeer (1994) (co-produced by BBC and France Animation)
 Cat Tales (1994–1996) (co-produced by France Animation)
 Robinson Sucroe (1995) (co-produced by France Animation)
 The Babaloos (on Vacation, season 4 only) (1995–1999) (co-produced by France Animation)
 The Little Lulu Show (1995–1999)
 Wimzie's House (1995–1996)
 Night Hood (1996)
 Arthur (1996–2022) (co-produced by WGBH, and Marc Brown Studios. Credited as CINAR for Seasons 1-8; credited as Cookie Jar Entertainment for Seasons 9-15. Seasons 16-19 are produced by 9 Story Media Group and Seasons 20-25 are produced by Oasis Animation)
 Ivanhoe The King's Knight (1997)
 Caillou (1997–2010) (credited as CINAR for Seasons 1-3; credited as Cookie Jar Entertainment for Seasons 4-5. Season 5 was also co-produced by Clockwork Zoo)
 Patrol 03 (1997) (co-produced by France Animation)
 Animal Crackers (1997–1999) (co-produced by Alphanim)
 The Country Mouse and the City Mouse Adventures (1997–1999) (co-production with WIC Entertainment and France Animation)
 The Adventures of Paddington Bear (1997–2000) (co-produced with Protecrea)
 Mumble Bumble (1998–2000)
 Flight Squad (1999)
 The Adventures of Shimajiro (1999) (scrapped)
 Ripley's Believe It or Not! (1999) (co-produced by Alphanim)
 Zoboomafoo (1999–2001) (co-production with Earth Creatures and Maryland Public Television)
 Mona the Vampire (1999–2006) (co-produced by Alphanim)
 A Miss Mallard Mystery (2000)
 The Baskervilles (2000) (co-produced by Alphanim)
 Journey to the West – Legends of the Monkey King (2000) (co-production with China Central Television)
 The Twins (2000)
 Treasure (2001) (co-produced by BBC)
 Upstairs, Downstairs Bears (2001) (co-produced by Egmont Imagination)
 Simon in the Land of Chalk Drawings (2002)
 Potatoes and Dragons (2004–2010) (co-produced by Alphanim)
 Creepschool (2004) (co-produced by Alphanim)
 Postcards from Buster (Arthur Spin-Off) (2004–2008) (co-production with Marc Brown Studios and WGBH Educational Foundation)
 Gerald McBoing-Boing (2005–2007) (co-produced by Teletoon, Classic Media and Dr. Seuss Enterprises, L.P.)
 Johnny Test (2005–2014) (Seasons 1–2 were produced by Warner Bros. Animation, and Coliseum Entertainment. Seasons 2–6 were produced by Cookie Jar Entertainment, and Season 6 was produced by DHX Media)
 Spider Riders (2006–2007) (co-produced by Bee Train)
 Nanoboy (2006–2009) (co-production with Scrawl Studios and AGOGO Media)
 Magi-Nation (2007–2008)
 Busytown Mysteries (2007–2010) (also known as Hurray for Huckle!)
 Will and Dewitt (2007–2008)
 World of Quest (2008–2009)
 Kung Fu Dino Posse (2009–2012) (co-produced with Sunwoo Korea Entertainment Inc., Sunwoo Asia-Pacific Pte Ltd., and Optix Entertainment GmbH)
 Noonbory and the Super Seven (2009)
 Doodlebops Rockin' Road Show (2010)
 Scan2Go (2010–2011) (distribution only in North America and South America)
 The Small Giant (2010) (distribution only in Canada)
 MetaJets (2010) (co-produced by Sunwoo)
 Mudpit (2011)

FilmFair 
 The Herbs (1968)
 Hattytown Tales (1969–73)
 The Adventures of Parsley (1970)
 The Wombles (1973–75)
 Paddington (1975–1980)
 Simon in the Land of Chalk Drawings (1976)
 The Perishers (1978–79)
 The Adventures of Portland Bill (1983)
 Moschops (1983)
 The Blunders (1986)
 The Shoe People (1987)
 Edward and Friends (1987)
 Bangers and Mash (1988)
 Windfalls (1988)
 Huxley Pig (1989–90)
 The Dreamstone (1990–95) (co-owned by WildBrain and Monster Entertainment)
 Rod 'n' Emu (1991)
 The Gingerbread Man (1992)
 The Legend of White Fang (1992–94)
 Astro Farm (1992–96)
 Juniper Jungle (1993)
 The Legends of Treasure Island (1993–95)

DIC Entertainment

Ragdoll Productions 
 Tronji (2009–2010)
 The Adventures of Abney & Teal (2011–2012)
 Dipdap (2011–2013)
 Twirlywoos (2015–2017)

Echo Bridge Entertainment 
 Beast Wars: Transformers (1996–1999)
 Captain Star (1997–1998)
 Hoze Houndz (1999–2002)
 Pumper Pups (1999)
 Old Tom (2001–2002)
 Henry's World (2002–2005)
 Connie the Cow (2003–2005)

Mattel/HIT Entertainment 
 Fireman Sam (1987–present)
 Bob the Builder (1998–present)
 Little People (1999–2002, 2004–2005) (co-produced by Egmont Imagination, Cuppa Coffee Studios, and Wreckless Abandon Studios)
 Rubbadubbers (2003–2005)
 Polly Pocket (2010–2018, 2018–present)
 Monster High (2010–2017)
 Ever After High (2013–2016)
 Enchantimals: Tales from Everwilde (2018–present)

Iconix Brand Group 
 The Charlie Brown and Snoopy Show (1983–1985) (produced by Lee Mendelson/Bill Melendez Productions)
 This Is America, Charlie Brown (1988–1989) (produced by Lee Mendelson/Bill Melendez Productions)
 Strawberry Shortcake (2003–2008) (produced by DIC Entertainment and American Greetings)
 Strawberry Shortcake's Berry Bitty Adventures (2010–2015) (co-production with MoonScoop Group and American Greetings)

Jay Ward Productions
 Rocky and His Friends/The Bullwinkle Show (1959–1964)
 Rocky and Bullwinkle
 Fractured Fairy Tales
 Aesop and Son
 Bullwinkle's Corner
 Mr. Know-It-All
 The Rocky and Bullwinkle Fan Club
 Peabody's Improbable History
 Dudley Do-Right of the Mounties
 Hoppity Hooper (1964–1967)
 George of the Jungle (1967)
 Super Chicken
 Tom Slick

Live-action series

WildBrain 
 Deadtime Stories (2012–2014) (co-production with Nickelodeon)
 Satisfaction (2013) (co-production with Bell Media and Lionsgate)
 Topsy and Tim (2013–2015)
 Hank Zipzer (2014–2016) (co-production with Walker Productions and Kindle Entertainment)
 Teletubbies (2015–2018)
 Playdate (2015–present) (co-production with Sinking Ship Entertainment)
 Backstage (2016–2017) (co-production with Fresh TV)
 Airmageddon (2016) (UK production for CBBC)
 We Are Savvy (2016–2018)
 Letterkenny (2016–present)
 The Zoo (2017–present) (UK production for CBBC)
 Creeped Out (2017–2019) (UK production for CBBC)
 Waffle the Wonder Dog (2017–present)
 Massive Monster Mayhem (2017)
 Are You Afraid of the Dark? miniseries (2019, 2021) (co-production with Nickelodeon and YTV)
 Bajillionaires (2019)
 Ruby & the Well (2022) (co-production with Shaftesbury Films)

Decode Entertainment/WildBrain Studios Toronto 
 Brats of the Lost Nebula (1998-1999) (co-production with Jim Henson Productions)
 Our Hero (2000–2002) (co-production with Heroic Film Company)
 The Zack Files (2000–2002)
 The Hoobs (2001–2002) (co-production with The Jim Henson Company)
 Be the Creature (2003–2004)
 Radio Free Roscoe (2003)
 Naturally, Sadie (2005–2007)
 The Adrenaline Project (2007–2008) (co-production with YTV)
 The Latest Buzz (2007–2010)
 Grandpa in My Pocket (2009, Season 1 distribution only)
 How to Be Indie (2009–2011) (co-production with Heroic Film Company and YTV)
 Make It Pop (2015–2016) (co-production with Tom Lynch Company, N'Credible Entertainment, and Nickelodeon)
 The Other Kingdom (2016) (co-production with Tom Lynch Company and Nickelodeon)

Halifax Film/DHXStudios Halifax 
 This Hour Has 22 Minutes (2005–present)
 North/South (2006)
 The Guard (2008–2009)
 That's So Weird! (2009–2012)

WildBrain (original)/DHX Los Angeles 
 Yo Gabba Gabba! (2007–2015)

CINAR/Cookie Jar Entertainment 
 Happy Castle (1988–1989)
 Are You Afraid of the Dark? (1992–2000) (co-production with Nickelodeon and YTV)
 The Intrepids (1993–1996)
 Wimzie's House (1995–1996)
 Space Cases (1996–1998)
 The Mystery Files of Shelby Woo (1996–1998) (co-production with Nickelodeon)
 Lassie (1997–1999) (co-produced by Classic Media and PolyGram Filmed Entertainment)
 Un Hiver de Tourmente (1998)
 Emily of New Moon (1998–2000) (co-production with WIC Entertainment and Salter Street Films)
 Sci-Squad (1999–2000)
 Zoboomafoo (1999–2001) (co-production with Maryland Public Television)
 Dark Oracle (2004–2006)
 The Doodlebops (2005–2007)
 Debra! (2011–2012)

DIC Entertainment

Ragdoll Productions 
 Rosie and Jim (1990–2000)
 Brum (1991–2002)
 Open a Door (1992)
 Tots TV (1993–1998)
 Tots Video (1997)
 Teletubbies (1997–2001)
 Teletubbies Everywhere (2002)
 Boohbah (2003–2006)
 Blips (2005–2006)
 In the Night Garden... (2007–2009)

Epitome Pictures 
 The Kids of Degrassi Street (1979–1986)
 Degrassi Junior High (1987–1989)
 Degrassi High (1989–1991)
 Degrassi Talks (1992)
 Liberty Street (1994–1995)
 Degrassi: The Next Generation (2001–2015) (co-production with Bell Media)
 Instant Star (2004–2008)
 The L.A. Complex (2012)
 Open Heart (2015)
 Degrassi: Next Class (2016–2017)

Echo Bridge Entertainment 
 Maniac Mansion (1990–1993)
 Star Runner (1990)
 The Odyssey (1992–1995)
 The Mighty Jungle (1994)
 Mysterious Island (1995)
 Straight Up (1996–1998)
 My Life as a Dog (1997)
 El Mundo del Lundo (1997-1998)
 Mirror, Mirror II (1997–1998)
 Mowgli: The New Adventures of the Jungle Book (1998)
 Legacy (1998–1999)
 Daily Tips for Modern Living (1998)
 The Mrs. Greenthumbs Show (1998–2000)
 The Famous Jett Jackson (1998–2001)
 Hollywood Safari (1998–2001)
 The Awful Truth (1999–2000)
 I Was a Sixth Grade Alien (1999–2001)
 Pirates (1999–2001)
 The Itch (2000)
 In a Heartbeat (2000–2001)
 Blackfly (2001–2002)
 Ace Lightning (2002–2004)
 Mental Block (2003–2005)

Jay Ward Productions
 Fractured Flickers (1962–1964)

Specials

Studio B Productions/WildBrain Studios Vancouver 
 Little Witch (1999) (co-production with Sony Wonder)
 Santa Mouse and the Ratdeer (2000) (co-production with Sony Wonder)
 The Legend of Frosty the Snowman (2004) (co-production with DreamWorks Animation)
 Side Show Christmas (2008) (co-production with Teletoon)

CINAR/Cookie Jar Entertainment 
 The Wonderful Wizard of Oz (compilation films based on 1986 anime)
 The Wonderful Wizard of Oz (1987)
 The Marvelous Land of Oz (1987)
 Ozma of Oz (1987)
 The Emerald City of Oz (1987)
 Madeline (television specials) (1988–1991) (co-produced by DIC Entertainment for the original special, and France Animation for the remaining five specials)
 Madeline (April 9, 1988)
 Madeline's Christmas (December 25, 1990)
 Madeline and the Bad Hat (August 11, 1991)
 Madeline and the Gypsies (September 25, 1991)
 Madeline's Rescue (October 18, 1991) 
 Madeline in London (November 28, 1991)
 The Real Story of... (co-produced by France Animation) 
 The Real Story of Humpty Dumpty (July 18, 1990)
 The Real Story of the Three Little Kittens (December 15, 1990)
 The Real Story of Itsy Bitsy Spider (October 16, 1991)
 The Real Story of O Christmas Tree (December 21, 1991)
 The Real Story of Happy Birthday to You (January 4, 1992)
 The Real Story of Twinkle Twinkle Little Star (1992)
 The Real Story of Au Clair de La Lune (1992)
 A Gift of Munsch (1994)
 The Sleep Room (two part miniseries; 1998) (co-produced by Alpha Media)
 Sparky N'Arfman (1999; pilot for Nick Jr.)
 Arthur (1996–2022; seasons 1–15 only)
 Arthur's Perfect Christmas (2000, co-produced by WGBH Educational Foundation)
 Arthur, It's Only Rock and Roll (2002, co-produced by WGBH Educational Foundation)
 Caillou's Holiday Movie (2003)

FilmFair 
 Paddington Goes to the Movies (1980)
 Paddington Goes to School (1984)
 Paddington's Birthday Bonanza (1986)
 The Wombles (1990–1991)
 World Womble Day (1990)
 The Wandering Wombles (1991)
 Brown Bear's Wedding (1991)
 White Bear's Secret (1992)

DIC Entertainment

Ragdoll Productions 
 Badjelly the Witch (2000)

Echo Bridge Entertainment 
 Cutaway (1992)
 Celtic Electric (1998)
 Roxanne's Best Christmas Ever (1999)
 Talking to Americans (2001)

Iconix Brand Group

Strawberry Shortcake

Peanuts

WildBrain 
 Sara Solves It (2015) (co-production with WGBH Educational Foundation and Out of the Blue Enterprises)
 Bob's Broken Sleigh (2015) (co-produced by Eh-Okay Entertainment)
 Ghost Patrol (2016)
 Caillou Specials (2022)

Films

WildBrain 
 My Little Pony: Equestria Girls (2013) (co-production with Hasbro Studios)
 Hamlet & Hutch (2013)
 My Little Pony: Equestria Girls – Rainbow Rocks (2014) (co-production with Hasbro Studios)
 Across the Line (2015)
 My Little Pony: Equestria Girls – Friendship Games (2015) (co-production with Hasbro Studios)
 Full Out (2016)
 My Little Pony: Equestria Girls – Legend of Everfree (2016) (co-production with Hasbro Studios)
 My Little Pony: Equestria Girls TV specials (2017) (co-production with Hasbro Studios)
 My Little Pony: The Movie (2017) (co-production with Allspark Pictures, Distributed by Lionsgate)
 The Strawberry Shortcake Movie (TBA) (co-production with Good Universe, Distributed by FilmNation Entertainment)

WildBrain (original)/DHX Los Angeles 
 Out In Space (1997)
 Humanstein (1998)
 A Dog Cartoon (1998)
 Hubert's Brain (2001)

CINAR/Cookie Jar Entertainment 
 Hockey Night (1984)
 Letters from a Dead Man (1986) (English version)
 John the Fearless (1987)
 Cat City (1987)
 The Treasure of Swamp Castle (1988)
 Train Mice (1989)
 The Great Cheese Conspiracy (1989)
 Million Dollar Babies (1994)
 Bonjour Timothy (1995)
 Wish Upon a Star (1996)
 The Best Bad Thing (1997)
 The Whole of the Moon (1997)
 Ghost of Dickens' Past (1998)
 Sally Marshall Is Not an Alien (1999)
 Heart: The Marilyn Bell Story (1999)
 Revenge of the Land (1999)
 Who Gets the House? (1999)
 Kayla (1999)
 Ivor the Invisible (2001)
 Both Sides of the Law (2001)

DIC Entertainment

Epitome Pictures 
 School's Out (1992)
 Degrassi Goes Hollywood (2009)
 Degrassi Takes Manhattan (2010)

Echo Bridge Entertainment 
 Wild Horse Hank (1979)
 The War Boy (1985)
 Magic Kid (1993)
 Bigfoot: The Unforgettable Encounter (1994)
 Magic Kid 2 (1994)
 The Power Within (1995)
 Two Bits & Pepper (1995)
 Earth Minus Zero (1996)
 My Uncle the Alien (1996)
 Saltwater Moose (1996)
 Tiger Heart (1996)
 Northern Lights (1997)
 The Girl with Brains in Her Feet (1997)
 Hollywood Safari (1997)
 Little Bigfoot (1997)
 Emma's Wish (1998)
 Little Bigfoot 2: The Journey Home (1998)
 Secret of the Andes (1998)
 Undercover Angel (1999)
 New Waterford Girl (1999)
 Jett Jackson: The Movie (2001)
 Bowling for Columbine (2002)
 The Man Who Saved Christmas (2002)
 When Zachary Beaver Came to Town (2003)

Nerd Corps Entertainment/WildBrain Studios Vancouver 
 Slugterra: Ghoul from Beyond (2014) (Co-produced with Disney XD Canada)
 Slugterra: Return of the Elementals (2014) (Co-produced with Disney XD Canada, Shout Factory, Screenvision and Cineplex)
 Slugterra: Slug Fu Showdown (2015) (Co-produced with Disney XD Canada)
 Slugterra: Eastern Caverns (2015) (Co-produced with Disney XD Canada)
 Slugterra: Into The Shadows (2016) (Co-produced with Family Chrgd)

Mattel Creations 
 Polly Pocket: Lunar Eclipse (2003)
 Polly Pocket 2: Cool at the Pocket Plaza (2005)
 PollyWorld (2006)
 Rainbow Magic: Return to Rainspell Island (2010)

Iconix Brand Group 
 Strawberry Shortcake: The Sweet Dreams Movie (2006)
 The Strawberry Shortcake Movie: Sky's the Limit (2009)

See also 
 List of libraries owned by WildBrain

References

External links 
 Distribution - WildBrain

Lists of animated films
WildBrain
Television series by DHX Media
Canadian television-related lists